The 2004–05 Washington State Cougars men's basketball team represented Washington State University for the 2004–05 NCAA Division I men's basketball season. Led by second-year head coach Dick Bennett, the Cougars were members of the Pacific-10 Conference and played their home games on campus at Beasley Coliseum in Pullman, Washington.

Seeded sixth in the conference tournament, the Cougars met third seed Stanford in the quarterfinal round.  The Cougars had swept the regular season series, but lost by

Postseason result

|-
!colspan=5 style=| Pacific-10 Tournament

References

External links
Sports Reference – Washington State Cougars: 2004–05 basketball season

Washington State Cougars men's basketball seasons
Washington State Cougars
Washington State
Washington State